The fourth season of Teen Wolf, an American supernatural drama created by Jeff Davis, premiered on June 23, 2014. The series was renewed for a fourth season of 12 episodes on October 12, 2013.

Plot 
Two months after the end of Season 3 and still healing from tragic losses (Allison, Boyd, Erica and Aiden), Scott (Tyler Posey), Stiles (Dylan O'Brien), Lydia (Holland Roden) and Kira (Arden Cho) return to a new semester of school with more human worries than supernatural, while also trying to help their new friend, Malia (Shelley Hennig), integrate back into society. But Kate Argent's (Jill Wagner) surprising resurrection brings a new threat to Beacon Hills along with the emergence of another mysterious enemy known simply as the Benefactor. Scott must also uphold the responsibility of his first Beta werewolf, Liam Dunbar (Dylan Sprayberry).

Cast

Main
 Tyler Posey as Scott McCall 
 Dylan O'Brien as Stiles Stilinski 
 Tyler Hoechlin as Derek Hale 
 Holland Roden as Lydia Martin 
 Shelley Hennig as Malia Tate 
 Arden Cho as Kira Yukimura

Recurring

Episodes

Production
A fourth season of 12 episodes was confirmed and premiered on June 23, 2014, on MTV. Filming began in February 2014.
Crystal Reed and Daniel Sharman did not return, making this the first season of the show not to star Reed and the first since season two not to star Sharman. Jill Wagner (Kate Argent) confirmed on Wolf Watch that she will be appearing more this season after her character made a surprise appearance in the season 3 finale.

New cast additions include Meagan Tandy as Braeden (who only appeared in 2 episodes of season 3), Dylan Sprayberry as "Liam", Khylin Rambo as Mason "an out-and-proud athlete" and Mason Dye as Garrett. In addition to this, Dylan O'Brien and Jeff Davis confirmed in interviews that Malia Tate (Shelley Hennig) and Kira Yukimura (Arden Cho) would be regulars this season and join the pack.

On July 14, 2014, during the original airing of the fourth episode of the season, there was an audio failure in one of the scenes. MTV posted the scene, with the proper audio, on its official Facebook account the following day.

Reception
The review aggregator website Rotten Tomatoes reported an approval rating of 67% and an average rating of 4.98/10 for the fourth season, based on 12 reviews. The website's critics consensus reads, "Teen Wolfs fourth season refreshingly seeks to mix things up but feels less confident than its predecessors, giving viewers reason to fear that this series may already be long in the tooth."

Awards and nominations

Home media
Season 4 was released on DVD in the United States on June 9, 2015, 20 days before the premiere of Season 5 on June 29, 2015.

References

2014 American television seasons
Teen Wolf (2011 TV series)

Celtic mythology in popular culture
Japanese mythology in popular culture
Mexican mythology
Norse mythology in popular culture